Chulabhorn Graduate Institute (CGI) is a multidisciplinary post-graduate academic institute, comprising faculty members from the Chulabhorn Research Institute (CRI), and other leading universities in Thailand, as well as from academic and research institutions from around the world. It is a part of the Chulabhorn Royal Academy (CRA), named after Princess Chulabhorn Walailak.

Academic programs 
Academic programs are divided into three main areas:
 Applied Biological Sciences (ABS)
 Chemical Biology (CB)
 Environmental Toxicology (ET)

History 
The Chulabhorn Graduate Institute is a private graduate institution established in 2005, to celebrate the 48th Birthday of Professor Princess Chulabhorn Mahidol. With the approval of the Ministry of Education, it was officially established as an autonomous higher education institution on December 28, 2005, having Professor Princess Chulabhorn as the Chancellor of the Institute Council.

External links
 Official website

References 

Universities and colleges in Bangkok
Institutes of higher education in Thailand
Chulabhorn Royal Academy